"Run-Around" is a song by American rock band Blues Traveler, featured on their fourth studio album, Four (1994). The song was the band's breakthrough hit, peaking at number eight on the US Billboard Hot 100 and number 13 on Canada's RPM Top Singles chart. It won the band's first Grammy Award in 1996, for Best Rock Vocal Performance by a Duo or Group.

Overview and history

"Run-Around" debuted on June 24, 1993, during a solo show featuring Blues Traveler frontman John Popper. The first full band performance of the song took place the next time it was played, February 21, 1994. The 1994 show was significant because it took place at the famous CBGB and the show introduced a number of songs that were to be on their next album, Four.

The song tells of the relationship Popper had with original bass player Felicia. Popper had a crush on her, but was worried because they also shared a close friendship. According to guitarist Chan Kinchila the two still remained close friends after the events of the songs. She was also the subject of a later song, "Felicia".

Music video
The video for the song has a Wizard of Oz motif, with Blues Traveler playing behind a curtain in a nightclub while a young, "hip" and more "photogenic" group appears to be playing the song. Dorothy Gale (Diana Marquis), the main character of the story, tries to get into the club.

She is turned away by the doorman, as are three other people whose appearances resemble the Scarecrow, the Cowardly Lion, and Tin Woodman characters. They rush to the locked back door, where they catch a glimpse of the show. Finding a club-goer passed out nearby, Dorothy transfers the stamp on his hand to her own and to the hands of her three companions, and they are able to get inside.

By this time, several brief shots of the actual band have been seen; they are playing the song in a darkened back area, with several bouncers guarding the entrance, and the onstage group is only lip-synching and miming in time. As Dorothy begins to realize something is amiss, her dog Toto slips past the bouncers and pulls open a curtain to expose the real band. She and the other three are quickly whisked away and the curtain is yanked shut by the club owner (Ken Ober) as the song ends.

Although the video for this song shows a Kansas driver's license, the license shown was not the current design but instead the design the state used in the mid to late 1980s. The name appearing on the license was misspelled as "Dorthy". The song was ranked number 76 in VH1'S 100 Greatest Songs of the '90s.

Live performances
In Blues Traveler's live shows, "Run-Around" has been played 997 times (as of February 2016) which is roughly 54% of the shows since its debut.

The band originally played the song much slower, as Popper wrote it to reflect a depressed mood; however, they sped it up before recording it. Starting in late 1998, the band began experimenting with a different sound. This new version of the song, referred to as "Fucked Run," brings out the depressed and slower side of the song that Popper felt when he wrote it. However, when they perform this version, it is as a segue into another song. The last half of the song is sung as the normal version.

While Blues Traveler recorded part of the third verse as "I shall drink in and always be full / yeah I will drink in and always be full", Popper originally wrote the second line as "My cup shall always be full." When they perform the song live, the band uses the original lyrics.

Track listing
All songs are written by John Popper except "Trust in Trust", lyrics written by John Popper and music written by Chan Kinchla.

US CD single
 "Run-Around" (single edit) – 4:12
 "Trust in Trust" – 3:02
 "Regarding Steven" – 4:44
 "Escaping" – 4:57
 "The Poignant & Epic Saga of Featherhead and Lucky Lack" – 5:11

Charts

Weekly charts

Year-end charts

In popular culture
 Alvin and the Chipmunks covered this song for their 2007 video game Alvin and the Chipmunks.
 The song achieved a brief resurgence in popularity in 2014, at its 20-year anniversary, and even briefly made the charts again.

References

External links
 BluesTraveler.com: Lyrics to Run-Around CD5

1994 songs
1995 singles
A&M Records singles
Blues Traveler songs